Callestick is a hamlet in Cornwall, England, UK. Little Callestick lies to the northeast, near Chyverton House. The name Callestick comes from the Cornish language roots kell "cell" and Estek, a personal name. 

The manor of Callestick was recorded in the Domesday Book (1086) when it was held by Robert, Count of Mortain from Bodmin Monastery; before 1066 it had been held by a thane from the monastery. There was 1 hide of land and land for 4 ploughs. There were 12 serfs, 10 acres of woodland, 2 cattle and 30 sheep. The value of the manor was 3 shillings though it had formerly been worth £1 sterling.

Landmarks
About  to the north-west of the settlement is an English Heritage scheduled monument. It is the remains of a small round enclosure (called a round) of a type that dates back to sometime between the latter part of the Iron Age and post-Roman Britain. The round at Callestock Veor appears to be of a circular hut and is in a reasonable condition compared to other examples of these sites. It was probably the dwelling of a pre-historic farmer and other examples of such sites nearby have dated back to the Bronze Age with the earliest such examples at around 1,700BC. A bowl barrow is a funerary monument that was built sometime in the Late Neolithic period to the Late Bronze Age (generally to the period 2400-1500 BC). This bowl barrow is unusual in that it is on relatively low-lying ground; normally bowl barrows are constructed in a more prominent position, such as a hill top. A little further to the west, a further pair of bowl barrows lie close together and are also listed monument.

About  to the south-east of Callestick is the West Weal Chiverton mine.  It was mainly a lead mine producing over 45,000 tons of high grade lead and over one million ounces of silver between 1859 and 1886.

References

Hamlets in Cornwall
Manors in Cornwall